William Stewart Thompson (born 1969) is the United States attorney for the Southern District of West Virginia since 2021. From 2007 to 2021, he served as a judge on the 25th Judicial Circuit of West Virginia.

Early life and education

Thompson was born in Charleston, West Virginia. He graduated as salutatorian from Scott High School. received his Bachelor of Science in Engineering from the West Virginia University in 1992 and his Juris Doctor from the West Virginia University College of Law in 1995.

Career 

In 1992, Thompson was a civil engineer for American Electric Power in Columbus, Ohio; he also served as president of Madison Healthcare, Incorporated from 1997 to 2007, and as vice president of Danville Lumber Company from 1994 to 2007. he was an associate at the law firm of Cook and Cook in Madison, West Virginia from 1995 to 2007. His primary focus was litigation, which included representing several hundred indigent clients in criminal defense and other matters. From 2007 to 2021, he served as a judge for the 25th Judicial Circuit of West Virginia after being appointed by West Virginia Governor Joe Manchin, to fill the vacancy left by the retirement of Judge  E. Lee Schlaegel Jr. He was sworn in on March 6, 2007. He was re-elected in 2008 and 2016. He resigned effective August 18, 2021, after being nominated as U.S. Attorney.

U.S. attorney 

On August 10, 2021, President Joe Biden nominated Thompson to be the United States Attorney for the Southern District of West Virginia. On September 30, 2021, his nomination was reported out of committee by voice vote. On October 5, 2021, his nomination was confirmed in the United States Senate by voice vote. On October 13, 2021, he was sworn in by Chief United States District Judge Thomas E. Johnston in a private ceremony.

References

External links

1969 births
Living people
20th-century American lawyers
21st-century American judges
21st-century American lawyers
American civil engineers
American health care chief executives
Businesspeople from Charleston, West Virginia
Businesspeople in timber
Engineers from West Virginia
Litigators
Lawyers from Charleston, West Virginia
People from Madison, West Virginia
United States Attorneys for the Southern District of West Virginia
West Virginia circuit court judges
West Virginia lawyers
West Virginia University alumni
West Virginia University College of Law alumni